Chrysoperla rufilabris, also known as the red-lipped green lacewing, is a species of green lacewing in the family Chrysopidae.

Distribution 
This species is native to the eastern portion of North America.

Description 

C. rufilabris are distinguished from other members of the genus found in North America by the broadly red genae, pointed apex of the fore wing, black gradate crossveins, and spinellae on the male genitalia.

Biology 
The larvae of this species prey upon soft-bodied insects including aphids, thrips, and whiteflies.

References

External links

 

Chrysopidae
Articles created by Qbugbot
Insects described in 1839